Anou Boussouil (in English "Great Chasm") is a limestone karst cave located in the mountains of Djurdjura, Algeria. The entrance to the cave is  up the mountainside. During the springtime rainy season, melting snow pours through a channel leading directly to the cave mouth, continuing the process of erosion. This distinguishes it from other caves in the Djurdjura range, which are inactive and no longer being enlarged through erosion. 

The cave was first scientifically explored in 1933 by the cavers Fourastier and André Belin. Later expeditions found that the cave was actually composed of two separate segments. The first segment is twisted and relatively narrow, eventually opening up into a larger cavern. The entrance to the second segment is a sinkhole descending approximately  into a sequence of pit chambers. This segment eventually opens into a flooded vault chamber.

References

See also
List of caves

Caves of Algeria